Henry Townsend (1649–1703) was the son of Henry Townsend, an early settler of the American Colonies.

Biography
Henry Townsend (1649-1703) was the son of Henry Townsend who emigrated to the colonies from England. Eventually Henry Townsend settled in Oyster Bay, where his son Henry Townsend was raised. Townsend Society of America DNA testing project has established that the Oyster Bay family is not related to Thomas Townsend of Lynn, MA.  The county of origin in England for Henry, John and Richard Townsend is not known.

Henry Townsend married Deborah Underhill in 1677. Captain Underhill was converted to Quakerism by his second wife, thus making the union of Henry Townsend and Deborah Underhill the combining of two of the most influential Quaker families in Oyster Bay.

They had at least four children together: Robert Townsend (b. 1687), Elizabeth Townsend (1692-1756), Henry (d. 1709) and Uriah Townsend (1698-1767).

References

1649 births
1703 deaths
Townsend family
People from Oyster Bay (town), New York
American Quakers
American people of English descent
Converts to Quakerism
People of New Netherland
17th-century Quakers
18th-century Quakers